Events from the year 1561 in art.

Events
Sculptors Bernhard and Arnold Abel are recorded as working at the Imperial Court in Vienna.
Juan Bautista Vázquez the Elder moves to Seville to complete an altarpiece, and remains there to work.
Michelangelo ceases work on the Pietà Firenze.

Works

 Alessandro Allori – Portrait of a Young Man (Ashmolean Museum, Oxford)
 Jacopo Bassano – The Journey of Jacob
 Titian – Mary Magdalene
 Paolo Veronese – Muse with a Lyre

Births
date unknown
Cornelis Danckerts de Ry, Dutch architect and sculptor (died 1634)
Johann Theodor de Bry, Flemish painter and engraver (died 1623)
Zacharias Dolendo, Dutch engraver (died 1601)
Antonio Mohedano, Spanish painter of the Renaissance period (died 1625)
Tobias Verhaecht, landscape painter and draughtsman in Italy and Antwerp (died 1631)
probable
Jan Collaert II, Flemish engraver and printmaker (died 1620)
Toussaint Dubreuil, French painter (died 1602)
Léonard Gaultier, French engraver (died 1641)
Adam van Noort, Flemish painter and draughtsman (died 1641)
Marcus Gheeraerts the Younger, Artist of the Tudor court, portraitist (died 1636)

Deaths
January 9- Luca Martini, Italian arts patron (born 1507
February - Roque Balduque, French sculptor (date of birth unknown)
March 4 - Lancelot Blondeel, Bruges-based Flemish painter (born 1498)
November 8 - Ippolito Costa, Italian painter (born 1506)
date unknown
Alonso Berruguete, Spanish painter, sculptor and architect (born 1488)
Simon Bening, miniature painter of the Ghent-Bruges school (born 1483)
Hans Bocksberger der Ältere, Austrian painter (born 1510)
Paul Dax, Austrian artist (born 1503)
Battista Franco Veneziano, Italian Mannerist painter and printmaker in etching (born c.1510)
probable
Erhard Altdorfer, German Early Renaissance printmaker, painter, and architect (born 1480)
Bernard Salomon, French painter, draftsman and engraver (born 1506)

References

 
Years of the 16th century in art